Alice Matthews Frame is a fictional character from Another World, an American soap opera on the NBC network. Created by Irna Phillips and William J. Bell, Jacqueline Courtney originated the role from 1964; she exited in 1975, and was succeeded by Susan Harney. Following Harney's exit in 1979, the role was subsequently portrayed by Wesley Ann Pfenning (1979), Vana Tribbey (1981) and Linda Borgeson (1981–1982). Courtney returned to the role in 1984 following Borgeson's exit; she exited the following year. She returned for a guest appearance in 1989.

Character history
Alice Matthews was born and raised in Bay City, Illinois, and was a member of the prominent Matthews family, though she grew up middle-class. She was an average college girl with no problems, until she met Steve Frame. They fell head over heels in love and soon decided to get married. 

There was just one thing in the way of Steve and Alice's happiness and her name was Rachel Matthews. Rachel was married to Alice's brother, Russ. Alice already disliked Rachel since she believed she was a gold digger who had only married Russ to become part of Bay City high society (and she would be correct). Rachel also fell for Steve and one night, after Steve and Alice had a fight, the pair made love. Rachel arrived at Steve and Alice's engagement party and announced she was pregnant with Steve's baby. When Steve rejected Rachel to stay with Alice, she passed the baby off as Russ's and he was named James Gerald "Jamie" Matthews. When the truth about Jamie's paternity came out, Alice left town.

In 1971, Alice returned to Bay City and finally married Steve. Shortly after Alice was pregnant. Rachel schemed to get Steve away from Alice by making the condition that Steve could only see Jamie in her presence. One day, Steve went to visit Jamie and Alice fell off a ladder and lost their child. Alice was convinced Steve was having an affair with Rachel and she fled to New York City. In the city, she called herself Alice Talbot and was the governess of Dennis Carrington, son of the dashing Eliot Carrington. Alice grew to care deeply for Dennis and Eliot, and Eliot even proposed marriage to Alice. Iris Carrington, Eliot's ex-wife and Dennis's mother, meddled in Alice and Eliot's relationship since she was hoping to reconcile with Eliot. Steve begged Alice for a second chance. Alice agreed to try again and the pair remarried. Steve went to prison for embezzlement and Alice had a mental breakdown. Her Aunt Liz moved in to take care of her. Tim McGowan convinced Alice to sign over Steve's power of attorney to him as well as a stock transfer. He did this to embezzle money from Steve. Alice was finally put into a sanitarium to be given proper help. Tim was eventually caught and his power of attorney was revoked.

Alice recovered and went home. She then learned she could never conceive another child, which Rachel found out. When Rachel told Steve, Alice thought they were over, but Steve did not care about her infertility. They reconciled and went off to St. Croix. Alice returned to nursing. One day at the hospital, she met a 10-year-old girl named Sally Spencer and wanted to adopt her. When Steve was in Australia, his helicopter crashed and he was presumed dead, leaving Alice devastated. She still decided to go ahead with Sally's adoption. Alice dated Willis Frame, Steve's brother, and they became engaged, but never made it down the aisle. 

Alice was finally head of Frame Enterprises and Willis was not happy. Sally's biological grandmother, Beatrice, was still mad she did not win custody of Sally and she kidnapped her. Luckily, Sally was rescued safe and sound. Alice eventually married Ray Gordon, Sally's biological uncle, only because she had given up hope that Steve was alive. Ray changed Frame Enterprises to Gordon Enterprises. She realized the marriage was a mistake and they divorced. Alice helped Sharlene Frame when Russ Matthews threw her out after discovering her past as a prostitute. When Dan Shearer came to town, they became close friends. Even though Dan was divorced from Alice's cousin, Susan, he and Alice became intimate. When Olive Randolph, Dan's ex, heard about their engagement, she tried to kill Alice in a fire. Alice's brother-in-law, John Randolph, saved her, but was killed in the process. Alice broke off her engagement to Dan. She left Sally with Liz to take a nursing position in Chicago. 

In 1981, Alice returned to Bay City and became a private nurse. Alice began dating Mac Cory, Rachel's ex-husband, and the two became engaged. Alice broke off her engagement to Mac when Steve turned up alive. The star-crossed lovers were reunited, but on the eve of their wedding, Steve and Rachel got trapped under some beams and he admitted his love for her. Alice and Steve did not go through with the marriage and Steve reunited with Rachel. Alice departed Bay City once more. Steve was later killed (for real this time) in a car crash. During her time away, Alice earned her medical degree and became a grandmother when it was discovered Sally had a son named Kevin, who she had given up and was reunited with. 

Alice returned to town for Sally's wedding to Kevin's father, David Thatcher. She missed the ceremony, which Sally had run out on. When David was killed, Alice thought Dr. Royal Dunning was responsible, but he was not. She helped Rachel recover from a bout of amnesia after she was kidnapped by dastardly Carl Hutchins. Rachel was horrified to learn how she treated Alice over the years, but Alice let her know it was all in the past. She had a relationship with Mark Singleton, but it did not work out. She accepted a position in Washington, D.C. and bid farewell to Bay City once more.

Sally was killed in a car accident, but Alice did not return for her funeral. She did return for the 25th anniversary of Brava magazine (the show's 25th anniversary). She and Rachel briefly reminisced about their history: Rachel said how happy Alice had made Steve and Alice said that it was Rachel who gave him a son. It appeared the two women were truly at peace with each other. Alice returned once more for Mac's funeral. This would be her last appearance in Bay City.

References
http://www.anotherworldhomepage.com/1alice.html

Fictional characters introduced in 1964
Another World (TV series) characters